Alpheus Babcock (September 11, 1785 – April 3, 1842) was a piano and musical instrument maker in Boston, Massachusetts and Philadelphia, Pennsylvania during the early 19th century. Babcock is best known for patenting a complete iron frame in a single casting used to resist the strain of the strings in square pianos, he also patented a system of stringing in squares, and improvements in piano actions.

Biography
Babcock was born in Dorchester, Massachusetts, and worked for musical instrument maker Benjamin Crehore (d.1828) before 1809. He established a workshop and music warehouse in Boston with brother Lewis at 44½ Newbury Street, but by 1812 they entered a partnership with organ maker Thomas Appleton (1785–1872) with workshops at 6 Milk Street. Following Lewis' death in 1814 the surviving partners formed a brief partnership with brothers Charles and Elna Hayt, the business was taken over by Mackay & Co., with Crehore's former partner, organ maker William Goodrich (d. 1834) as one of the partners, and by 1817 reorganized as The Franklin Music Warehouse with Joshua Stevens as foreman, continuing at Milk street under John Rowe Parker through 1823. Babcock may have worked during this period in Philadelphia, but by 1822 worked at the rear of 11 Marlboro street, Boston and moved the following year to Parkman's Market, Cambridge street. The Mackays continued an association with Babcock throughout the 1820s, with many of the instruments labelled "for G. D. Mackay" and "for R. Mackay".

Babcock received a silver medal at the 1824 Exhibition of the Franklin Institute in Philadelphia, as well as in 1825, and in 1827 a silver medal and special mention for a square with his patented solid cast-iron frame (1825).

In 1830 he relocated to Philadelphia, at the time the largest producer of pianos in the United States, where he patented what he called "cross stringing", and introduced resilient cloth hammer coverings.  He was associated with instrument maker and seller John C. Klemm, his former agent, and by late 1832 worked as foreman for piano maker William Swift, at whose warehouse at 142 Chestnut street, he advertised in The Daily Chronicle in 1833, one could see iron framed pianos for which he claimed sole manufacturing rights. Babcock won honors at the 1833 Franklin Institute exhibition, along with C. F. L. Albrecht of Philadelphia, and Nunns & Co. of New York.

Babcock returned to Boston in 1837 employed by Chickering & Mackays who had formed a partnership in 1830. Babcock's improvements helped Chickerings lead the American piano industry through the 1850s.

Notes
  Ripin and Kuronen indicate "G. D. Mackay" as George Mackay, d. 1824, nephew of John Mackay (Boston Industrialist), and "R. Mackay" as Ruth, (1744–1833) widow of Mungo Mackay, and mother of John Mackay, but Holman writes she died 1820, and that John Mackay was married to her daughter Fanny.
  For "the best horizontal piano", a square "made for J. Mackay, of Boston" with "the strings of the lower octaves... covered with flattened wire" Spillane, p. 86
  Not related to over stringing, this invention involved twisting shared wires at the hitch pins.
  Babcock assigned his 1839 patent to John Mackay, William H. Mackay and Jonas Chickering. John Mackay, like George D. Mackay in 1822, had given Babcock's address in 1825, 1828, and 1829 Boston Directories.

References

"Biographical Memoir of William M. Goodrich, Organ Builder." (1834) The New England Magazine
Stevens, Paran. (1870) "Manufacture of Pianos in the United States." Reports of the United States Commissioners to the Paris Universal Exposition, 1867. Govt. Print. Off., Washington, D. C.
Teele, J. K. (1887) The History of Milton, Mass.
Spillane, Daniel (1890) A History of the American Pianoforte D. Spillane, New York.
Holman, Mary L. (1929) Ancestors and Descendants of John Coney. N. E. Hist. Genealogical Society, Boston.
Harding, R. (1978) The Piano-Forte. Gresham Books. Old Woking, Surrey.
Belt, Philip R. (1988) The New Grove Piano. W. W. Norton & Co., New York.
Kuronen, Darcy. (2002) "Alpheus Babcock, Piano Maker" Museum of Fine Arts, Boston.

Arzhruni, Ahan. Liner notes. Childhood Memories. New World Records 80590-2

1785 births
1842 deaths
People from Dorchester, Massachusetts
People from Philadelphia
19th-century American inventors
American musical instrument makers
Piano makers
Inventors from Massachusetts